Jan Adolf Boutmy Prins (born 10 December 1930) is a Dutch Antillean fencer. He competed in the individual sabre events at the 1964 and 1968 Summer Olympics.

References

External links
 

1930 births
Living people
Dutch Antillean male fencers
Olympic fencers of Netherlands Antilles
Fencers at the 1964 Summer Olympics
Fencers at the 1968 Summer Olympics